Sreenidhi Institute of Management and Science ( SIMS ), Anikad is the first initiative of Sreenidhi Trust Kottayam. The institute is Situated at Elampally, Anikkad near Kodungoor in Kottayam District, Kerala State. Institute is Affiliated to Mahatma Gandhi University Kottayam. Currently SIMS Offers five Degree programmes from MG University.

Courses
 B.Com - Model II (Vocational: Computer Applications)
 B.Com - Model II (Vocational: Finance and Taxation)
 English Literature and Communication Studies - Model III (Two Main)
 Bachelor of Computer Applications
 B.Sc - Electronics

References

 Sreenidhi Institute
 Sreenidhi Trust

Colleges in Kerala
Colleges affiliated to Mahatma Gandhi University, Kerala
Universities and colleges in Kottayam district